Emil Reinecke (26 April 1933 – 4 May 2011) was a German professional racing cyclist. He rode in the 1960 Tour de France.

References

External links
 

1933 births
2011 deaths
German male cyclists
People from Einbeck
Cyclists from Lower Saxony